Zheleznogorsk Airport  is an airport in Russia located 10 km south of Zheleznogorsk-Ilimsky. It services small airliners.

References
RussianAirFields.com

Airports built in the Soviet Union
Airports in Irkutsk Oblast